The 2013 Sam's Town 300 was the third stock car race of the 2013 NASCAR Nationwide Series and the 17th iteration of the event. The race was held on Saturday, March 9, 2013, in North Las Vegas, Nevada at Las Vegas Motor Speedway, a  permanent D-shaped oval racetrack. The race took the scheduled 200 laps to complete. Sam Hornish Jr., driving for Penske Racing, would survive two ensuing restarts and defend eventual-second Joe Gibbs Racing place driver Kyle Busch to win his second career NASCAR Nationwide Series win and his first and only win of the season. To fill out the podium, Brian Vickers of Joe Gibbs Racing would finish third.

Background 

Las Vegas Motor Speedway, located in Clark County, Nevada outside the Las Vegas city limits and about 15 miles northeast of the Las Vegas Strip, is a 1,200-acre (490 ha) complex of multiple tracks for motorsports racing. The complex is owned by Speedway Motorsports, Inc., which is headquartered in Charlotte, North Carolina.

Entry list 

*When Chase Miller failed to qualify, Miller would replace Yeley for the race.

Practice 
Originally, three practice sessions were scheduled to be held, with two on Friday and one on Saturday. However, persistent rain on Friday would cancel all activities for Friday. Instead of qualifying on Saturday, a lone practice session was held on Saturday so that drivers could practice.

The only practice session was delayed for over 40 minutes but was eventually held on Saturday, March 9, at 9:30 AM PST.

Starting lineup 
Qualifying was originally going to be held on Saturday, March 9, but was canceled due to persistent rain that canceled Friday's activities. As a result, NASCAR set the starting lineup by last year's owner's points for the first 36 spots, and the last four spots were determined by number of attempts made within the 2013 season.

Brian Vickers of Joe Gibbs Racing would earn the pole.

Full starting lineup

Race results

References 

2013 NASCAR Nationwide Series
NASCAR races at Las Vegas Motor Speedway
March 2013 sports events in the United States
2013 in sports in Nevada